The Calgary Cup was a four-team ice hockey tournament held from December 26, 1986, to January 3, 1987, in Calgary, Alberta, Canada.  It was a preview event for the 1988 Winter Olympics, and featured the national hockey teams of Canada, Czechoslovakia, the Soviet Union and the United States.  All games were held at the Olympic Saddledome.

The tournament was won by Czechoslovakia, who defeated the Soviet Union 3–2 in the gold medal game.  Canada won the bronze.  Jiri Hrdina was named the tournament's top forward, Jaroslav Benak was named top defenceman and Yevgeni Belosheikin the top goaltender.  Legendary Soviet goaltender Vladislav Tretiak was the honorary chairman of the tournament.

Many future National Hockey League players played in the Calgary Cup.  In addition to Hrdina, Brett Hull, Dominik Hasek, Joe Nieuwendyk, Zarley Zalapski, Cliff Ronning, Viacheslav Fetisov and Sergei Makarov, among others, suited up for their respective national teams.

Game play
The Calgary Cup was organized as one of several "preview events" for the 1988 Winter Olympics, set to be held in Calgary thirteen months after this tournament.  It featured the national teams of Canada, the United States, the Soviet Union and Czechoslovakia, as international hockey's dominant powers of the time, in a round-robin tournament that would see the top two teams meet in a gold medal game, and the bottom two play for the bronze.  The tournament would also help the Canadian and American teams prepare for the European style of play.

The tournament opened on December 27, 1986, with the host Canadians facing the United States.  The American team, which had formed only 36 hours previous, had only one full workout together prior to the game. They nonetheless shocked the Canadians, winning by a 5–3 score on the strength of two goals by Brett Hull.  Obviously disappointed with his team's result, Canadian coach Dave King stated: "We're obviously behind the eight ball.  We have to go out and beat the Czechs and Russians, I guess.  That'll be fun."

The second game saw the Soviet Union defeat the Czechoslovaks 4–0 on the strength of a shutout by Soviet goaltender Yevgeni Belosheikin.  The goaltender, who had previously been suspended prior to the tournament for what was rumoured to be alcohol problems, earned comparisons to legendary Soviet goaltender Vladislav Tretiak.  The Czechoslovaks rebounded the next night with a 6–3 victory over the Canadians in a game that left the home squad feeling much better than following the loss to the Americans.

The Soviets pummelled the Americans 10–1 in the fourth game as eight different Soviet players scored. Describing the loss, American coach Craig Patrick said the Soviets made the Americans look like "the guys who travel with the Harlem Globetrotters.  At times, you can look pretty foolish."  The Soviets then defeated Canada 4–1 on New Year's Eve in a game that was tied at one heading to the third period.  The Russians outshot Canada 45–19 in the contest.

The final game of the round robin saw Czechoslovakia embarrass the United States 11–2 on the strength of a Jiri Hrdina hat trick.  As a result, the Czechoslovaks earned a match-up against the Soviet Union for the gold medal, while Canada would face the Americans for the bronze.

Results

Final standings

Bronze medal game

Gold medal game

See also
Ice hockey at the 1988 Winter Olympics
Ice hockey in Calgary

References

1986–87 in Canadian ice hockey
1986–87 in American ice hockey
1986–87 in Soviet ice hockey
1986–87 in Czechoslovak ice hockey
Ice hockey competitions in Calgary
International ice hockey competitions hosted by Canada